During the 1979–80 English football season, Everton F.C. competed in the Football League First Division. They finished 19th in the table with 35 points.

Review

13 October 1979: Crystal Palace's unbeaten start to the season ends with a 3–1 defeat to Everton at Goodison Park.

October 1979: John Gidman is signed from Aston Villa for £650,000 (2013: £) in a deal which sees midfielder Pat Heard move the other way at a valuation of £100,000.

29 February 1980: With the season approaching its final quarter, Manchester United have moved level on points at the top of the First Division with Liverpool, who have a game in hand. Bolton Wanderers remain bottom, with just one League win from their first 27 matches, and  Derby County and Bristol City also remain in the relegation zone, with Everton occupying the last safe spot. 

1 March 1980: Everton lose 2–1 at home to Liverpool in the First Division Merseyside derby, and during the game their legendary former striker Dixie Dean dies from a heart attack in the stands, aged 73.

8 March 1980: Second Division West Ham United, having beaten Aston Villa 1–0 in the FA Cup sixth round, are joined in the last four by Liverpool, Everton and holders Arsenal.

12 April 1980: Both FA Cup semi-finals – Arsenal versus Liverpool and Everton versus West Ham United – end in draws.

16 April 1980: West Ham United beat Everton 2–1 at Elland Road to reach the FA Cup final.

Final league table

Results

Football League First Division

FA Cup

League Cup

UEFA Cup

Squad

Deaths
 1 March 1980 – Dixie Dean, 73, legendary Everton striker who scored 60 league goals in the 1927–28 season; died on 1 March after suffering a heart attack while watching Everton's game against Liverpool at Goodison Park.

References

1979-80
Everton
Everton F.C. season